The Central District of Mahabad County is in West Azerbaijan province, Iran. At the National Census in 2006, its population was 179,697 in 39,752 households. The following census in 2011 counted 198,757 people in 50,507 households. At the latest census in 2016, the district had 222,069 inhabitants in 61,895 households.

References 

Mahabad County

Districts of West Azerbaijan Province

Populated places in West Azerbaijan Province

Populated places in Mahabad County